Dušan Perniš (born 28 November 1984) is a Slovak professional footballer who plays as a goalkeeper for Dubnica.

Perniš has been capped for Slovakia at senior level.

Club career
Perniš began his professional football career at FC Nitra, in the youth team, before moving to Dubnica at the age of eighteen. However, at first at Dubnica, Perniš spent time on the bench, but in a few seasons, Perniš soon became a regular goalkeeper in the first team. In the 2004–05 season, Perniš made thirty two appearances and the club finished in fourth place, which also earned them a place in Europe. Following two wins against Hungarian side Vasas and Turkish side Ankaraspor in Europe, the club faced the English side Newcastle United. Perniš was in goal for match, but Newcastle United proved to be too strong and Dubnica failed to win either leg losing 3–1 and 2–0.

In the January transfer window, Perniš joined MŠK Žilina. At Žilina, Perniš soon faced a fight for the first choice with Dušan Kuciak, but lost. The next season, Perniš left for Senec on loan and stayed there four months before returning to his parent club, where he made 22 appearances. At the end of the 2006–07 season, Žilina won the league. After his first loan, Perniš returned once more on loan to Dubnica, the team he started his football career with, and spent 18 months there. During his return, Perniš made 43 appearances.

Upon his return from Dubnica, Perniš established himself in the first team, following the sale of Kuciak to Vaslui and made 32 appearances. During this spell, Perniš played all the club's European campaign, including a 2–1 win over Aston Villa in the last group-stage match. At the end of the season, which was his return, the club finished in second place. After that, Perniš was the club's first choice goalkeeper until he left the club. During his time at Žilina, Perniš earned a nickname of Perník, which is  gingerbread in English.

Dundee United
After signing a pre-contract deal in July 2009 to join Dundee United in January 2010, Dušan made his debut in the January 2010 2–0 Scottish Cup win against Partick Thistle, also keeping a clean sheet on his league debut four days later. Perniš kissed silver for the first time on 15 May 2010, when he kept a clean sheet in the Scottish cup final for Dundee United when Dundee United beat Ross County. After the match, Perniš says winning the Scottish Cup and revealed he cannot wait to show it [medal] to his family; he also cannot wait to have a challenge by playing in European game. Since moving to Dundee United, Perniš says he is now settled very well at the club, but desires to play in the Premier League in the future.

The next season, Perniš' comment on playing in Europe, came true when he was in goal when Dundee United lost and drew 2–1 on aggregate against Greek side AEK Athens. In his first full season at Dundee United, Perniš was in the club's squad, playing in goal entirely; which also happened again the following season.

On 9 February 2012, it announced that Dundee United announced the signing of Polish goalkeeper Radosław Cierzniak on a pre-contract agreement and confirmed Pernis would be leaving in the summer when his contract expired. A month ago, Dundee United planned to start entering talks with Perniš on a new deal. Since becoming a free agent, Perniš announced his intention to stay in the UK, insisting his family have settled down. Perniš turned down a move to SPL's rival Hibernian, insisting he want to move to England; Perniš also turned a move back to his homeland, Senica.

After deciding to play for an English club, Perniš went on a trial with Championship side Leicester City

Pogoń Szczecin
Perniš joined newly promoted Polish side Pogoń Szczecin on 2 August 2012, on a three-year deal. Aberdeen manager Derek McInnes has expressed an interest in the goalkeeper. However, Perniš failed to establish himself as a first-choice goalkeeper at Pogoń. He left the club in June 2013 after his contract expired. Although Perniš went on trials with Danish club Viborg FF, he eventually joined the Corgoň Liga reigning champions ŠK Slovan Bratislava.

Slovan Bratislava
After signing his contract with Slovan in September 2013, Perniš was sent on loan to fellow league side FC Nitra, where he spent the autumn part of the 2013–14 season. The goalkeeper returned from loan in the winter break.

Iraklis
On 18 July 2015, Perniš signed a two-year contract with Greek Superleague club Iraklis.

Beroe Stara Zagora
On 27 January 2017, Perniš joined Bulgarian club Beroe Stara Zagora.

International career
Perniš was an unused substitute for Slovakia during the 2003 FIFA World Youth Championship.

Perniš made his debut against Thailand in the Final game of the 2004 King's Cup in Bangkok, Thailand, when he played the entire 90 minutes of the game, conceding one goal in the 13th minute by Sakda Joemdee from a penalty kick. The match ended in a 1–1 tie and Slovakia went on to win the competition after defeating the home side 5–4 in the penalty shootout, giving Perniš a lot of the credit for the win.

On 12 August 2009, Perniš returned to Slovakia's squad in the 1–1 away draw against Iceland in a friendly after coming on as a substitute for Ján Mucha at half time. 
Later, he became a regularly benched substitute in the UEFA Euro 2012 qualifying and the 2014 FIFA World Cup qualification, yet Ján Mucha was given a priority. Slovakia failed to qualify for either of the tournaments.

References

Honours
Dundee United
 Scottish Cup: 2010

External links
 
 Dušan Perniš at mskzilina.sk 

1984 births
Living people
Sportspeople from Nitra
Slovak footballers
Association football goalkeepers
Slovakia international footballers
Slovakia youth international footballers
2010 FIFA World Cup players
MŠK Žilina players
FC Senec players
FK Dubnica players
Dundee United F.C. players
Pogoń Szczecin players
FC Nitra players
Iraklis Thessaloniki F.C. players
PFC Beroe Stara Zagora players
Slovak Super Liga players
2. Liga (Slovakia) players
Scottish Premier League players
Super League Greece players
First Professional Football League (Bulgaria) players
Slovak expatriate footballers
Slovak expatriate sportspeople in Scotland
Expatriate footballers in Scotland
Slovak expatriate sportspeople in Poland
Expatriate footballers in Poland
Slovak expatriate sportspeople in Greece
Expatriate footballers in Greece
Slovak expatriate sportspeople in Bulgaria
Expatriate footballers in Bulgaria